Events from the year 2001 in Italy.

Incumbents
 President: Carlo Azeglio Ciampi
 Prime Minister: Giuliano Amato (until 11 June), Silvio Berlusconi (starting 11 June)

Events
 21 February -
 Sicilian Mafia boss Bernardo Provenzano arrested in Sicily after 38 years on the run.
 Novi Ligure Murder: a mother and child are murdered in Novi Ligure.
 13 May - a general election is held and is won by Silvio Berlusconi.
 20 July–22 July - 27th G8 summit held in Genoa.
 20 July - an anti-globalisation protester at the G8 summit is shot dead by police.
 8 October - Linate Airport disaster: Scandinavian Airlines Flight 686 crashes at Linate Airport in Milan killing 118.
 15 December - The Leaning Tower of Pisa reopens after 11 years and $27,000,000 spent to fortify it, without fixing its famous lean.
December - The Fiat Stilo is launched to replace the outdated Brava/Bravo.

Undated
 De-Javu, an Italian house duo is founded.
 Editoria & Spettacolo publishing house is established in Rome.
 MolecularLab, a scientific website, is founded.

Births
 22 April - Tito Traversa, climber (died 2013)

Deaths
 27 January - Marie-José of Belgium, last Queen of Italy, consort to Umberto II (born 1906)
 12 February - Tiberio Mitri, boxer (born 1926)
 13 February - Ugo Fano, physicist (born 1912)
 14 February - Piero Umiliani, composer (born 1926)
 23 February - Sergio Mantovani, racing driver (born 1929)
 10 March - Massimo Morsello, musician and political activist (born 1958)
 5 April - Aldo Olivieri, football player (born 1910)
 12 April - Alberto Erede, conductor (born 1909)
 20 April - Giuseppe Sinopoli, conductor and composer (born 1946)
 25 April - Michele Alboreto, racing driver (born 1956)
 26 April - Renzo Vespignani, painter and illustrator (born 1924)
 May - Armando Nannuzzi, cinematographer (born 1925)
 14 May - Mauro Bolognini, film director (born 1922)
 20 May - Renato Carosone, musician (born 1920)
 23 May - Alessandro Natta, politician (born 1918)
 26 May - Vittorio Brambilla, racing driver (born 1937)
 18 June - Paolo Emilio Taviani, politician (born 1912)
 20 July - Carlo Giuliani, protester shot dead at the G8 summit (born 1978)
 22 July - Indro Montanelli, journalist and historian (born 1909)
 26 July - Giuseppe Sensi, Cardinal (born 1907)
 19 September - Aldo Capitanio, comic book artist (born 1952)
 11 October - Beni Montresor, artist (born 1926)
 3 November - Lucio Colletti, philosopher (born 1924)
 8 November - Paolo Bertoli, Cardinal (born 1908)
 9 November - Giovanni Leone, Prime Minister (born 1908)
 5 December - Franco Rasetti, physicist (born 1901)

See also
 2001 in Italian television
 List of Italian films of 2001

References

 
Italy
Years of the 21st century in Italy
2000s in Italy
Italy